Do Paise Ki Dhoop, Chaar Aane Ki Baarish is an Indian  film written, and directed by Deepti Naval, starring Manisha Koirala, Rajit Kapur and Sanaj Naval.

Cast
Manisha Koirala as Juhi
Rajit Kapur as Debu
Sanaj Naval as Kaku
Milind Soman
Alyy Khan as Ali (guest appearance)

Plot
In this art film, Juhi is an aging prostitute whose son Kaku requires a wheelchair. She finds it challenging to take care of him with the limited number of customers that now find her attractive. Debu, a not-so-successful lyricist, is dumped by his boyfriend, and is out on streets. These characters, in need of money and love, bump into each other, after which their lives take a similar direction. Their relationships, born out of mutual needs, change their perceptions about each other, which in turn brings a change in them—finally, a sunny day after days of merciless downpour.

Production
There are many sequences in this movie which are shot in the rain, during the Bombay monsoons, with  Kiran Deohans of Jodha Akbar fame taking charge as the cinematographer. The music score is by Sandesh Shandilya. This movie is Manisha Koirala's comeback movie.

Release
This art film premiered at the market section of 2009 Cannes Film Festival. It was slated to release theatrically on 8 March 2012 in India but was postponed. The film was released worldwide on Netflix on 22 September 2019.

Critical reception
The film got a positive response at 2009 Cannes Film Festival.

Gapers Block gave a moderate rating, calling the plot unoriginal, comparing it to an "elongated episode of Will & Grace". The representation of Debu, who is semi-closeted, was also criticised, for its stereotyped gay characteristics. while ImagineIndia was of the opinion that,"...characters do not appear stereotypical, but a modern, sensitive and realistic portrait of people struggling to find happiness, with the ebbs and tides of human relationships"

A review in The Citizen called the film "niche" while praising the performances of three principal characters stating, "But the cream and the cake go to the three actors".

Accolades

2009- Best Feature Film - Chicago South Asian Film Festival
2010-Best Screenplay - The New York Indian Film Festival (MIAAC)

 Official Selection
 Special Screening venue Cannes Film Festival, 2009
 The Indian Film Festival of Houston, 2009
 Chicago South Asian Film Festival, 2010 (Opening film)
 The New York Indian Film Festival (MIAAC), 2010
 ImagineIndia Film Festival, Spain 2010
 Seattle South Asian Film Festival, 2011 (Opening film)
 India International Film Festival, Tampa Bay, USA, 2012
 First Annual Washington DC South Asian Film Festival, 2012

References

External links
Official website
Facebook page

2009 direct-to-video films
2009 films
2000s Hindi-language films
Gay-related films
Indian LGBT-related films
2009 directorial debut films
Indian direct-to-video films